A JID or Jabber Identity (also called a Jabber ID) is the username or account name used to access a Jabber account.

They usually take the form  in a similar way to email addresses.

The resource component is not necessary in order to contact a Jabber user.

Transports, agents, and other automated parts of the Jabber network may not have a user part to the JID.

In a similar way to Sendmail, accessing other protocols is possible with Jabber transports. Users can then contact from a client such as MSN Messenger using the JID form .

Limitations
Jabber usernames are limited to 1023 characters and the following characters are not allowed:
  ("at" sign)
  (colon)
  (single quote)
  (double quote)
  (open angle bracket) and > (close angle bracket)
  (ampersand)
  (carriage return),  (newline),  (tab) and any other control character
 white space

Instant messaging

vi:JID